The Raj Hamsa Clipper is an Indian ultralight trike, designed and produced by Raj Hamsa Ultralights since the 1990s. The aircraft is supplied as a complete ready-to-fly-aircraft.

Design and development
It features a cable-braced hang glider-style high-wing, weight-shift controls, a two-seats-in-tandem open cockpit without a cockpit fairing, tricycle landing gear and a single engine in pusher configuration.

The Clipper was developed into the longer range Raj Hamsa Voyager.

The aircraft is made from bolted-together aluminum tubing, with its double surface Raj Hamsa-made wing covered in Dacron sailcloth. Its  span wing is supported by a single tube-type kingpost and uses an "A" frame weight-shift control bar. The powerplant is a twin cylinder, air-cooled, two-stroke, dual-ignition  Rotax 503 engine or the twin cylinder, air-cooled, two-stroke, dual-ignition  Hirth 2706 engine.

Specifications (Clipper)

References

External links

1990s Indian sport aircraft
1990s Indian ultralight aircraft
Single-engined pusher aircraft
Ultralight trikes